In enzymology, a tropomyosin kinase is an enzyme that catalyzes the chemical reaction

ATP + tropomyosin  ADP + O-phosphotropomyosin

Thus, the two substrates of this enzyme are ATP and tropomyosin, whereas its two products are ADP and O-phosphotropomyosin.

This enzyme belongs to the family of transferases, specifically those transferring a phosphate group to the sidechain oxygen atom of serine or threonine residues in proteins (protein-serine/threonine kinases). The systematic name of this enzyme class is ATP:tropomyosin O-phosphotransferase. Other names in common use include tropomyosin kinase (phosphorylating), and STK.

References

 
 
 

EC 2.7.11
Enzymes of unknown structure